Paul Lardry (1928–2012) was a général d'armée of the French Army who served almost an entire career and Commandant of the Foreign Legion.

Military career

After completing a course at a private military institution, he entered Saint-Cyr promotion « général Aubert Frère » (1948–1950). He accordingly commenced his career at the 27th Alpine Chasseur Battalion. In 1951, he joined the Foreign Legion. He was assigned to the 13e DBLE engaged in Indochina, a tour during which he was wounded. He received accordingly the Croix de guerre des théâtres d'opérations extérieures (2 palms and 2 stars), and upon his return, he was assigned to Morocco at the Corps of the 4th Foreign Infantry Regiment 4e RE in 1955.

He served in Algeria, where he was cited three times with Cross for Military Valour. He commanded notably the 2nd Mounted Saharan Company of the Foreign Legion.

At the beginning of 1960, he was a captain in the 1st Foreign Regiment 1e RE at Aubagne then followed a course at the Superior War School, and served thereafter as a lieutenant-colonel in the general staff headquarters in Paris beginning of 1970.

In 1974, he received the command of the 13th Demi-Brigade of Foreign Legion 13e DBLE, promoted to rank of colonel in 1975 and received the Légion d'honneur in 1976. He left the command of the 13e DBLE in the summer of 1976. He commanded thereafter French elements in Tchad from February until September 1980.

He was nominated to the first action of officer generals, at the rank of Général de brigade in quality of a Commandant of the Foreign Legion Groupment (1980–1982) and 31st Brigade (1981–1982), a post which he occupied from 1980 to 1982. 

In 1981, the 150th anniversary of the French Foreign Legion and the 50th anniversary of the Commandement de la Légion Étrangère, was celebrated during the tenure of général Paul Lardry. 

He was then accordingly designated to the superior commandment of the French Area Forces of the Indian Ocean stationed at the Réunion in 1983. He was accordingly promoted to général de division the same year.

In 1986, he was promoted to général de corps d'armée. He accordingly commanded the Force d'Action Rapide FAR and organized the following years several designated manoeuvers in Germany. In 1988, he was promoted to général d'armée and accordingly left the command of the FAR. He was admitted to the second section of officer generals in 1991.

Recognitions and honors 

  Grand Croix of the Légion d'honneur
  Grand croix de l'ordre national du Mérite
  Croix de guerre des théâtres d'opérations extérieures
  Croix de la Valeur militaire
  Médaille coloniale with clasp « Extrême-Orient » and clasp « Tchad » 
  Médaille commémorative de la campagne d'Indochine with 2 stars for WIA
  Médaille commémorative des opérations de sécurité et de maintien de l'ordre en Afrique du Nord with clasp « Maroc » – « Algérie », "Sahara"

See also 

Major (France)
French Foreign Legion Music Band (MLE)
Jacques Lefort
Pierre Jeanpierre
Pierre Darmuzai
Saharan Méharistes Companies (méharistes sahariennes)

References

Sources 
 Répertoire des chefs de corps
 Centre de documentation de la Légion étrangère
 Répertoire des citations (BCAAM)

Officers of the French Foreign Legion
1928 births
2012 deaths